Adolfo Sevilla Azcuna (born February 16, 1939) is a Filipino jurist who served as an Associate Justice of the Supreme Court of the Philippines from 2002 to 2009. He was appointed to the Court by President Gloria Macapagal Arroyo on October 24, 2002.   he was the Chancellor of the Philippine Judicial Academy (PHILJA), having been appointed to that position by the Supreme Court of the Philippines on June 1, 2009.

Profile 

Azcuna  received the degree of Bachelor of Arts, with academic honors, at the Ateneo de Manila in 1959 and the degree of Bachelor of Laws, cum laude, at the same institution in 1962. He was admitted to the Philippine Bar in 1963, placing 4th in the 1962 bar examinations. He forthwith embarked on a government career as Assistant Private Secretary of then Presiding Justice Jose P. Bengzon of the Court of Appeals in 1963 and, thereafter, upon the appointment of the latter to the Supreme Court in 1964, as his Private Secretary.

Justice Azcuna taught International Law at his alma mater, Ateneo de Manila, from 1967 to 1986. In 1982, he completed post-graduate studies in International Law and Jurisprudence at the Salzburg University in Austria.

Representing Zamboanga del Norte, he was elected as member of the 1971 Constitutional Convention. Subsequently, he was appointed as a member of the 1986 Constitutional Commission. He held several government posts during the term of President Corazon C. Aquino, first as Presidential Legal Counsel, then as Press Secretary and subsequently as Presidential Spokesman. In 1991, he was appointed Chairman of the Philippine National Bank. On October 17, 2002, he was appointed Associate Justice of the Supreme Court by President Gloria Macapagal Arroyo.

In 2007, Justice Azcuna was conferred the Metrobank Foundation Professorial Chair in International and Human Rights Law for which he delivered a presentation entitled, “International Humanitarian Law: A Field Guide to the Basics.”

Justice Azcuna delivered a presentation entitled, “The Writ of Amparo: The Philippine Experience So Far,” as the first recipient of the Founding Chancellor Emeritus Justice Ameurfina Melencio-Herrera Award for the Most Outstanding Professorial Lecturer.

On January 8, 2013, the Junior Chamber International (JCI) Senate Philippines and the Insular Life Assurance Co., Ltd. conferred to Justice Azcuna The Outstanding Filipino (TOFIL) Award for 2012 in the field of Justice/Law.

As a holder of the Chief Justice Artemio V. Panganiban Professorial Chair on Liberty and Prosperity, Justice Azcuna delivered a presentation entitled, “Supreme Court Decisions on the Economic Provisions of the Constitution” on April 18, 2013, at the Ateneo School of Law.

The International Commission of Jurists (ICJ) has elected Justice Azcuna as one of its five new commissioners for a term of five years from August 12, 2014, to August 11, 2019. The ICJ is dedicated to ensuring respect for international human rights standards through the law. Commissioners are known for their experience, knowledge and fundamental commitment to human rights.

On September 27, 2016, the Ateneo de Manila University during its 2016 Traditional University Awards conferred with Justice Azcuna the Lux-in-Domino Award. This capstone award that requires "the crowning achievement of both life and work is given to an extraordinary individual who has incarnated in life, and perhaps even in death, in an outstanding and exemplary manner, the noblest ideals of the Ateneo de Manila University".  The citation stated: "For living as a selfless public servant who puts country before self and as a man of deep faith whose devotion to his family is unchanging; for devoting more than 50 years of his life to judicial work, driven by a commitment to the delivery of justice; for ensuring the protection of every Filipino’s constitutional right to life, liberty, and security through the writ of amparo; for lighting a path of excellence, service, and probity that young Filipinos and Ateneans may follow."

In November 2017, Justice Azcuna was elected as a new member of the International Organization for Judicial Training (IOJT) Board of Executives at the General Assembly held during the 8th IOJT Conference on the Training of the Judiciary. PHILJA hosted the 2017 Conference, being one of IOJT's founding members.

Justice Azcuna's major publications include “International Sales of Goods,” “Transnational Law Practice,” “International Law Teaching in the Philippines,” “Doing Business in the Philippines,” “Foreign Judgment [Monetary] Enforcements in the Philippines,” “Piercing the Veil of Corporate Entity: From Willets to Santos,” “ASEAN Conflict of Law,” and “The Supreme Court and Public International Law.”

Gregory Santos Ong case 
Since the creation of the Philippine Supreme Court in 1901, no presidential appointment of a Supreme Court Associate had ever been nullified by the High Tribunal. But on July 3, 2007, Azcuna's judgment made history. The Court granted the petition of two foundations that sought to block Gregory S. Ong’s appointment over the citizenship issue. Azcuna wrote that Ong would be unable to join them on the bench "until he had proven in court that he was a natural-born Filipino citizen and corrected the records of his birth and citizenship". The court declared its decision to be final and effective immediately.

Some notable opinions 
 Republic of Indonesia v. Vinzon (2003) — on a foreign state's immunity from suit
 Tecson v. COMELEC (2004) – Separate Opinion — on the nationality of presidential candidate Fernando Poe, Jr.
  MWSS v. Hon. Daway (2004) — on corporate rehabilitation of MWSS
 Chavez v. COMELEC (2004) — on scope of advertisement ban covering candidates for senatorial candidates
 Abello v. CIR (2005) — on taxability of political contributions for donor's tax
 ABAKADA v. Ermita (2005) – Concurring and Dissenting — on constitutionality of 2005 Expanded Value Added Tax Law
 BAYAN v. Ermita (2006) — on constitutionality of rally permit requirement and policy of calibrated preemptive response
 Lambino v. COMELEC (2006) – Separate Opinion — on people's initiative as a mode to amend the Constitution

References

External links 
 Justice Adolfo S. Azcuna (Official Supreme Court Webpage)

Associate Justices of the Supreme Court of the Philippines
1939 births
Living people
People from Zamboanga del Norte
20th-century Filipino lawyers
Presidential spokespersons (Philippines)
Corazon Aquino administration personnel
Ateneo de Manila University alumni
Academic staff of Ateneo de Manila University
University of Salzburg alumni
Secretaries of the Presidential Communications Operations Office
21st-century Filipino judges
Members of the Philippine Constitutional Commission of 1986